Ibarra Canton is a canton of Ecuador, located in Imbabura Province. Its capital is the town of Ibarra. Its population in the 2001 census was 153,256 and 181,175 in the 2010 census.

Ibarra is located in the Andes region of northern Ecuador.

The canton is divided into seven parishes: Ambuquí (Ampuki), Angochagua (Ankuchawa), Carolina (Karulina), La Esperanza, Lita, Salinas, San Antonio de Ibarra.

Demographics 
Ethnic groups as of the Ecuadorian census of 2010:
Mestizo  78.2%
Indigenous  8.8%
Afro-Ecuadorian  8.7%
White  3.8%
Montubio  0.3%
Other  0.2%

See also 
 Inca-Caranqui, archaeological site 
 La Esperanza, Ecuador
 Yawarkucha

References

Cantons of Imbabura Province